Changwon Hwang clan is a Korean clan. With its bon-gwan in Changwon, South Gyeongsang Province, it remains the largest Hwang clan in South Korea.

Origins
Hwang Rak, a minister in the Han dynasty, began the clan in Korea after being cast ashore on his way to Vietnam in 28 CE and then being naturalized in Silla.

Notable clan members
 Hwang Ho-dong
 Hwang Kyo-ahn
 Hwang Sok-yong
 Hwang Woo-yea
 Hwang Woo-suk
 Hwang Mi-young
 Hwang Min-hyun

See also 
 Foreign clans in Korean

References 

 
Hwang clans